Live at the Sydney Opera House is a live album by Australian singer-songwriter Josh Pyke with the Sydney Symphony Orchestra. It was released in July 2016 and peaked at number 27 on the ARIA Charts.

Upon release, Pyke said "[I'm] very excited to say the live recordings of the shows I did with the Sydney Symphony Orchestra at the amazing Sydney Opera House are out now! I'm so proud of this record. The whole experience was amazingly rewarding and a huge learning curve for me.
I love the fact that these songs have been given a new lease on life in this new form, and I can't wait to share them with you! Thank you so much for your support, and I hope you enjoy the record."

At the ARIA Music Awards of 2016, the album won the ARIA Award for Best Original Soundtrack, Cast or Show Album.

Reception

Tim Kroenert from The Music said "Collaborations between popular artists and orchestras often feel ego-driven, yet the songs performed here, selected mostly from Pyke's first four albums (the shows predated 2015's But for All These Shrinking Hearts), at least conspire to remind us what a smart songwriter he is. His voice is in great shape too, and the arrangements bring genuine freshness: tribal percussion and solo trumpet make an oddity of 'Still Some Big Deal'; swelling strings carry 'Goldmines' from alt-country to Spaghetti Western; the woodwind flourishes on 'Love Lies' are lovely. Elsewhere, 'Sew My Name', 'Memories & Dust' and others simply bloom with renewed drama."

Track listing

Charts

Release history

References 

2016 albums
Josh Pyke albums
ARIA Award-winning albums
Albums recorded at the Sydney Opera House
Live albums by Australian artists